Ulaiasi Wainidroa is a Fijian rugby league footballer who represented Fiji at the 1995 World Cup.

References

Living people
Fijian rugby league players
Fiji national rugby league team players
I-Taukei Fijian people
Year of birth missing (living people)